Convoy SL 125 was the 125th of the numbered series of World War II SL convoys of merchant ships from Sierra Leone to Liverpool. Ships carrying commodities bound to the British Isles from South America, Africa, and the Indian Ocean travelled independently to Freetown, Sierra Leone, to be convoyed for the last leg of their voyage. Thirty-seven merchant ships departed Freetown on 16 October 1942 and were joined at sea by five more.

Initial contact
The only United States merchant ship and escorting sloop ,  HMS Copinsay and Free French corvette Commandant Drogou had been detached by the time U-203 found the convoy on 25 October. U-203 was depth charged and damaged while attempting to attack the straggling British tanker Anglo Maersk. The tanker was subsequently shadowed by U-134 and damaged by U-509.

27 October
The armed merchant cruiser and troopship HMS Esperance Bay was detached with the  HMS Juliet, tugboat HMS Salvonia, and repair ship HMNZS Kelantan when U-409 found and reported the main convoy of 37 ships on 27 October. U-659 was depth charged and damaged while attempting to attack the convoy. After moonrise, U-604 sank the damaged Anglo Maersk while U-509 torpedoed the British freighters Pacific Star and Stentor.

28 October
After unsuccessful submerged daylight attacks on 28 October, U-509 sank the British freighter Nagpore and damaged the British freighter Hopecastle after sunset. U-203 sank the damaged Hopecastle before dawn.

29 October
U-509 sank the British freighter Britanny during foul weather on the night of 29–30 October. The British tanker Bullmouth (sailing in ballast) was damaged by U-409 and sunk by U-659. The British freighter Corinaldo was damaged by both U-509 and U-659 before being sunk by U-203.

30 October
Improved weather brought coordinated attacks on the night of 30–31 October. U-409 torpedoed the British freighter Silverwillow while U-604 torpedoed the British transport President Doumer and the British freighter Baron Vernon. The British freighter Tasmania was damaged by U-659 and sunk by U-103. The Norwegian freighter Alaska was damaged by U-510, but reached England safely with the help of newly arriving escorts.

Aftermath
Long-range bombers of RAF Coastal Command arrived over the convoy on 31 October. Admiral Dönitz cancelled operations on the morning of 1 November. The convoy was reinforced with eleven more escorts and reached Liverpool on 9 November. It had suffered the greatest loss of any SL convoy, but its timing focused the available U-boats in the area away from the Operation Torch convoys for the allied invasion of North Africa on 8 November 1942. Some historians have suggested that the trade convoy SL 125 was an intentional tactical diversion to keep U-boats away from the loaded troop transports.  Eleven of the ships surviving this convoy sailed two months later with convoy ON 154, in which four of them were sunk.

Ships in convoy

See also
 Convoy Battles of World War II

Notes

References 
 
 
 
 

SL125
C